Tetraethylammonium chloride (TEAC) is a quaternary ammonium compound with the chemical formula (C2H5)4N+Cl−, sometimes written as Et4N+Cl−. In appearance, it is a hygroscopic, colorless, crystalline solid. It has been used as the source of tetraethylammonium ions in pharmacological and physiological studies, but is also used in organic chemical synthesis.

Preparation and structure
TEAC is produced by alkylation of triethylamine with ethyl chloride.

TEAC exists as either of two stable hydrates, the monohydrate and tetrahydrate. The crystal structure of TEAC.H2O has been determined, as has that of the tetrahydrate, TEAC.4H2O.

Details for the preparation of large, prismatic crystals of TEAC.H2O are given by Harmon and Gabriele, who carried out IR-spectroscopic studies on this and related compounds. These researchers have also pointed out that, although freshly-purified TEAC.H2O is free of triethylamine hydrochloride, small quantities of this compound form on heating of TEAC as the result of a Hofmann elimination:
Cl− + H-CH2-CH2-N+Et3 → Cl-H + H2C=CH2 + Et3N

Synthetic Applications
To a large extent, the synthetic applications of TEAC resemble those of tetraethylammonium bromide (TEAB) and tetraethylammonium iodide (TEAI), although one of the salts may be more efficacious than another in a particular reaction. For example, TEAC produces better yields than TEAB or TEAI as a co-catalyst in a reaction to prepare diarylureas from arylamines, nitroaromatics and carbon monoxide.

In other examples, such as the following, TEAC is not as effective as TEAB or TEAI:

 2-Hydroxyethylation (attachment of -CH2-CH2-OH) by ethylene carbonate of carboxylic acids and certain heterocycles bearing an acidic N-H.
 Phase-transfer catalyst in geminal di-alkylation  of fluorene, N,N-dialkylation of aniline and N-alkylation of carbazole using aqueous sodium hydroxide and alkyl halides.

Biology
In common with  tetraethylammonium bromide and  tetraethylammonium iodide, TEAC has been used as a source of tetraethylammonium ions for numerous clinical and pharmacological studies, which are covered in more detail under the entry for Tetraethylammonium. Briefly, TEAC has been explored clinically for its ganglionic blocking properties, although it is now essentially obsolete as a drug, and it is still used in physiological research for its ability to block K+ channels in various tissues.

Toxicity
The toxicity of TEAC is primarily due to the tetraethylammonium ion, which has been studied extensively. The acute toxicity of TEAC is comparable to that of tetraethylammonium bromide and tetraethylammonium iodide. These data are provided for comparative purposes; additional details may be found in the entry for Tetraethylammonium.

See also
 Tetraethylammonium
 Tetraethylammonium bromide
 Tetraethylammonium iodide
 Tetramethylammonium chloride

References

Tetraethylammonium salts
Chlorides